Andre Leconte (1894–1990) was a French architect.

Designs
The Lebanese government contracted with him to design Beirut International Airport at Khalde (1948-1954). 

He also designed the Lazarieh office building (1953) in central Beirut, and Rizk hospital built in 1957 in Achrafieh. 

Leconte also participated in the conception of Nouakchott, capital of then-French Mauritania, with the assistance of Robert Joly.

Honours
Leconte received the "Prix de Rome" award.

References

20th-century French architects
1894 births
1990 deaths
Place of birth missing